Sigfrit Steiner (31 October 1906 – 21 March 1988) was a Swiss actor. His first stage performance was in 1928  in Gera. He performed in more than one hundred films. He was married to journalist and author Anne Rose Katz.

Selected filmography

 Fusilier Wipf (1938) - Oberleutnant
 Constable Studer (1939) - Untersuchungsricher Steffen
 Dilemma (1940) - Prosecutor
 Das Menschlein Matthias (1941) - Gemperle
 Bieder der Flieger (1941) - Schwarzhausen
 Steinbruch (1942) - Näppi - Dorfidiot
 Menschen, die vorüberziehen (1943) - Gendarme
 The Last Chance (1945) - Military Doctor
 Madness Rules (1947) - Kommissar
 Nach dem Sturm (1948)
 Land der Sehnsucht (1950)
 Palace Hotel (1952) - Gloor
 The Village (1953) - Heinrich Meile
 On Trial (1954) - Geôlier (uncredited)
 Uli the Tenant (1955) - Gegenanwalt
 Polizischt Wäckerli (1956) - Arzt
 Kitty and the Great Big World (1956) - Polizeibeamter
 Oberstadtgass (1956) - Polizist
 Taxichauffeur Bänz (1957) - Tonis Chef
 Bäckerei Zürrer (1957) - Tramp with Cigar Starting Music in Opening Scene (uncredited)
 It Happened in Broad Daylight (1958) - Det. Feller
 Der Schinderhannes (1958) - Baron Achbach
  (1959)
  (1960)
 Schneewittchen und die sieben Gaukler (1962) - Inhaber Sutor Heizungen (uncredited)
 Anne Bäbi Jowäger - II. Teil: Jakobli und Meyeli (1962) - Gerichtspräsident
 Stop Train 349 (1963)
 A Man in His Prime (1964) - Kriminalinspektor Scherbl
 The Trap Snaps Shut at Midnight (1966) - Dr. Smeat
 Der Fall (1972) - Polizeichef
 Cry of the Black Wolves (1972)
 The Pedestrian (1973) - Auditor
 Fluchtgefahr (1974) - Hausbursche Stotz
 The Sudden Loneliness of Konrad Steiner (1976) - Konrad Steiner
 Die Magd (1976) - Bryner
 Waldrausch (1977) - Waldrauscher
  (1977) - Diener Riebisch
 Brass Target (1978) - Herr Schroeder
 When Hitler Stole Pink Rabbit (1978) - Onkel Julius
 Bread and Stones (1979) - Tierarzt
 Das gefrorene Herz (1980) - Korber
 Der Mond is nur a nackerte Kugel (1981) - Moserbauer
 Imperative (1982) - Professor
 Wagner (1983, TV Series) - King Ludwig I of Bavaria
 A Love in Germany (1983) - Melchior
 Embers (1983) - Obert Wettach
 Die schwarze Spinne (1983) - Hornbachbauer
 Lisa und die Riesen (1984)
 Fatherland (1986) - Drittemann
 Duet for One (1986) - Leonid Lefimov
 Wenn ich die Antwort wüßte (1987)
 La nuit de l'eclusier (1989) - Father of Charles Belloz (final film role)

References

External links
 
 Short biography

1906 births
1988 deaths
Swiss male film actors
Actors from Basel-Stadt
Swiss male stage actors
Swiss male television actors
20th-century Swiss male actors
German Film Award winners